The 2011 Astana Cup was a professional tennis tournament played on hard courts. It was the second edition of the tournament which was part of the 2011 ATP Challenger Tour. It took place in Astana, Kazakhstan between 22 and 28 August 2011.

ATP entrants

Seeds

 1 Rankings are as of August 15, 2011.

Other entrants
The following players received wildcards into the singles main draw:
  Karan Rastogi
  Anton Saranchukov
  Serizhan Yessenbekov
  Denis Yevseyev

The following players received entry from the qualifying draw:
  Mikhail Elgin
  Sarvar Ikramov
  Mohamed Safwat
  Alexander Ward

Champions

Singles

 Rainer Schüttler def.  Teymuraz Gabashvili, 7–6(8–6), 4–6, 6–4

Doubles

 Karan Rastogi /  Vishnu Vardhan def.  Harri Heliövaara /  Denys Molchanov, 7–6(7–3), 2–6, [10–8]

External links
ITF Search
ATP official site

Astana Cup
Astana Cup